Alexander Wilson (5 March 1840 – 5 January 1911) was a New Zealand cricketer. He played in one first-class match for Canterbury in 1877/78.

See also
 List of Canterbury representative cricketers

References

External links
 

1840 births
1911 deaths
New Zealand cricketers
Canterbury cricketers
Sportspeople from Kanpur